The Anglo-Dutch Treaty of 1814 (also known as the Convention of London) was signed by the United Kingdom and the Netherlands in London on 13 August 1814.

The treaty restored most of the territories in the Moluccas and Java that Britain had seized in the Napoleonic Wars, but confirmed British possession of the Cape Colony on the southern tip of Africa, as well as portions of South America. It was signed by Robert Stewart, Viscount Castlereagh, on behalf of the British and diplomat Hendrik Fagel, on behalf of the Dutch.

Terms

Possessions 
The treaty returned the colonial possessions of the Dutch as they were at 1 January 1803, before the outbreak of the Napoleonic Wars in the Americas, Africa, and Asia, with the exception of the Cape of Good Hope and the South American settlements of Demerara, Essequibo and Berbice, where the Dutch retained trading rights.

In addition, the British ceded the island of Banca off the island of Sumatra in exchange for the settlement of Cochin in India and its dependencies on the coast of Malabar. The Dutch also ceded the district of Bernagore, situated close to Calcutta, in exchange for an annual fee.

Cooperation 
The treaty also noted a declaration of 15 June 1814 by the Dutch, that ships for the slave trade were no longer permitted in British ports. That restriction would be extended to a ban on involvement in the slave trade by Dutch citizens. Britain also agreed to pay £1,000,000 to Sweden to resolve a claim to the Caribbean island of Guadeloupe.

The British and the Dutch agreed to spend £2,000,000 each on improving the defences of the Low Countries. More funds, of up to £3,000,000, are mentioned for the "final and satisfactory settlement of the Low Countries in union with Holland."

Disputes arising from the treaty were the subject of the Anglo-Dutch Treaty of 1824.

See also 
 Anglo-Dutch Slave Trade Treaty of 1818
 Anglo-Dutch treaties of 1870–1871
 Anglo-Dutch Treaty of 1824

References

Footnotes

Bibliography 

1810s in Curaçao and Dependencies
1810s in the Dutch East Indies
1814 in British law
1814 in the British Empire
1814 in the Dutch Empire
1814 in the Netherlands
1814 treaties
August 1814 events
British rule in Indonesia
Curaçao and Dependencies
Dutch conquest of Indonesia
Dutch East Indies
History of Guyana
History of Kochi
History of the Dutch Caribbean
Napoleonic Wars treaties
Netherlands–United Kingdom treaties
Treaties of the United Kingdom (1801–1922)
Treaties of the United Kingdom of the Netherlands
1814 in London